Mahbubur Rahman is a Jatiya Party (Ershad) politician and the former Member of Parliament of Comilla-7.

Career
Rahman was elected to parliament from Comilla-7 as an Independent candidate in 1988.

References

Jatiya Party politicians
Living people
4th Jatiya Sangsad members
Year of birth missing (living people)